Joseph Fluerty (1 May 1903 – 25 December 1977) was a New Zealand mountaineer and guide. He was born on 1 May 1903.

He died at Nelson on Christmas Day 1977 and was buried in the Marsden Valley Cemetery.

References

1903 births
1977 deaths
Ngāi Tahu people
New Zealand mountain climbers
Burials at Marsden Valley Cemetery